Francisco Javier Santillán Morales (born 6 February 1992) is a Mexican professional footballer who plays as a centre-back for Tlaxcala.

Career

Club career
After a spell in Venezuela with Monagas, Santillán returned to Tlaxcala FC in January 2020.

Honours
Chapulineros de Oaxaca
Liga de Balompié Mexicano: 2020–21

References

External links

1992 births
Living people
Mexican footballers
Mexican expatriate footballers
Association football defenders
Murciélagos FC footballers
Tlaxcala F.C. players
Correcaminos UAT footballers
Mineros de Zacatecas players
Monagas S.C. players
Ascenso MX players
Liga Premier de México players
Tercera División de México players
Venezuelan Primera División players
Mexican expatriate sportspeople in Venezuela
Expatriate footballers in Venezuela
Footballers from Guadalajara, Jalisco
Liga de Balompié Mexicano players